Thiazyl trifluoride is a chemical compound of nitrogen, sulfur, and fluorine, having the formula . It exists as a stable, colourless gas, and is an important precursor to other sulfur-nitrogen-fluorine compounds. It has tetrahedral molecular geometry around the sulfur atom, and is regarded to be a prime example of a compound that has a sulfur-nitrogen triple bond.

Preparation
 can be synthesised by the fluorination of thiazyl fluoride, NSF, with silver(II) fluoride, :

Reactions
 reacts with carbonyl fluoride in the presence of hydrogen fluoride to form pentafluorosulfanyl isocyanate.

References 

Fluorides
Nonmetal halides
Nitrides
Thiohalides
Sulfur–nitrogen compounds